The PCL-161 is a truck-mounted 122 mm self-propelled howitzer used by the Chinese People's Liberation Army Ground Force. The designation 'PCL' is an acronym derived from pinyin.

Development
The PCL-161 was first unveiled while doing exercises in Tibet Autonomous Region in October 2020. It is speculated to be a successor of the 122 mm truck mounted howitzer PCL-09.

Design
PCL-161 features a 122 mm howitzer with semi-automatic loader and digital fire control system. The range is 22 km with conventional ammunition and 30 km with rocket-assisted projectiles. It features various improvements over the PCL-09, including better firing accuracy, the ability to fire directly in the forward direction of the vehicle. The PCL-161 features a semi-automatic loading system that is identical to the one found on the PCL-181, where the operator places the shell on the loading arm and the loading arm loads the round into the breech. The fire control system is also identical to that of the PCL-181, featuring automatic calculation and gun-laying via the vehicle-mounted fire control computer.

The truck chassis is based on the FAW MV3 series of tactical trucks, specifically the 4x4 CTM-133 variant. During combat, two front vertical stabilizers and two rear stabilizers are extended and dug into the ground to dampen the recoil.

Operators 
 : People's Liberation Army Ground Force

References
Notes

Bibliography

Self-propelled artillery of the People's Republic of China
Wheeled self-propelled howitzers
Military vehicles introduced in the 2020s